Nabis lineatus is a species of damsel bug in the family Nabidae.

It is found in Europe from the South of the British Isles and Scandinavia to the North of the Mediterranean region and East across the Palearctic to Russia and Kazakhstan and Northeast China. The range is disjunct. In Western and Northern Europe, the species occurs mainly in the area of climate influenced by the Atlantic coasts and lowlands, in the East, the species is, however, found isolated  in salty places inland. It is not present in the central uplands and mountains.

N. lineatus lives in Carex and Juncus   habitats. In the continental area it is found only in salty places inland.

Nabis lineatus  lives close to the ground as well as high up on sedges (Carex), rushes (Juncus), Molinia , Eriophorum, Glyceria. The micropterous adults go through four stages of nymph.

References

Nabidae
Insects described in 1851
Taxa named by Anders Gustaf Dahlbom